Koegel may refer to:

People
Arthur Koegel (born 1889–?), member of Wisconsin State Assembly
Debbie Koegel (born 1977), American ice dancer
Karl Kögel (born 1917–?), German ice hockey player
Max Koegel (1895–1946), German Nazi SS concentration camp commandant
Pete Koegel (born 1947), American baseball player
Robert Koegel, American psychologist

Companies
Koegel Meat Company, headquartered in Flint Township, Michigan, United States
Kögel Trailer, a vehicle manufacturer in Germany

German-language surnames
Disambiguation pages with surname-holder lists